Vogel Glacier is a glacier flowing into Flandres Bay 3 nautical miles (6 km) southeast of Cape Willems, on the west coast of Graham Land. The glacier appears on an Argentine government chart of 1952. Named by the United Kingdom Antarctic Place-Names Committee (UK-APC) in 1960 for Hermann W. Vogel (1834–1898), German chemist who introduced the first orthochromatic emulsion for photographic plates in 1903.

Glaciers of Danco Coast